Rees-Jones is a compound surname of Welsh origin. It is composed of the names Rees and Jones. People with this name include

 Deryn Rees-Jones, Anglo-Welsh poet
 Sarah Rees Jones, British historian
 Trevor Rees-Jones (businessman), billionaire, president and CEO of Chief Oil & Gas
 Trevor Rees-Jones (bodyguard) (born 1968), British bodyguard and sole survivor of the car crash that killed Diana, Princess of Wales

See also
 Sir Edgar Rees Jones (1878–1962), Welsh barrister and Liberal Party politician
 Peter Rees Jones (1843-1905), department store founder

Compound surnames
Surnames of Welsh origin